is a Japanese animation studio established in April 2006.

Works

Television series

OVA/ONAs
Yurumates (2012)
Go! Go! 575: Meippai ni, Hajiketeru? (2014, co-production with Lay-duce)
Oneechan ga Kita (2014)
Tamashichi (2015)
Tenchi Muyo! Ryo-Ohki 4 (2016–2017, co-production with AIC)

Notes

References

External links
 

 
Animation studios in Tokyo
Japanese companies established in 2006
Mass media companies established in 2006
Japanese animation studios